Game Party Champions is the fifth videogame in the Game Party series, and was a launch title for the Wii U console in North America and the PAL region. It is the successor to Game Party: In Motion.

Mini Games
It includes 8 mini games which are: 
Ping Pong
Skill Ball
Water Gun
Mini Golf
Air Hockey
Hoop Shoot
Football
Baseball

Reception
Game Party Champions received extremely negative reviews. It holds a score of 24% on Metacritic. Official Nintendo Magazine called it "as welcome as an ingrown toenail and twice as ugly". Ken Barnes of Nintendo Life gave the game a 1/10, saying "Game Party Champions is – to put it nicely – a bad game. We’re not even venturing into “so bad that it’s good” territory, either. We’re way past that. On the shelves on Wii U launch day, you could pick up any other title for just a few pounds more than the asking price of this. Alternatively, you could have not bothered buying any games, and still had more fun than if you’d walked out of the store with Game Party Champions. This is so bad that your great-great-grandchildren will want to change their surname when they find out that you once played it. Avoid.".

References

2012 video games
Nintendo Network games
Party video games
Video games developed in the United States
Warner Bros. video games
Wii U games
Wii U eShop games
Wii U-only games